Bowraville is a small town in the Mid North Coast hinterland of New South Wales, Australia in the Nambucca Valley. The town is known for tourism with attractions such as a folk museum, a war museum, a historic theatre, and other historic buildings.

Bowraville is considered one of the most disadvantaged towns in New South Wales with low income levels, high unemployment, and a high proportion of students not meeting education standards. On 5 November 2011, however, Bowraville was honoured as the Winner of the Cultural Heritage Award and came third overall in the Tidy Towns Awards by Keep Australia Beautiful - Tidy Towns.

History
The Indigenous Gumbaynggirr and Ngaku people have inhabited the area for thousands of years, and today around 15% of the population are Indigenous Australians. The Gumbaynggirr lands cover an area of the Mid North Coast from the Nambucca River to as far north as the Clarence River (Grafton), west to Armidale and eastward to the Pacific coast. The area was mostly subtropical rainforest until the arrival of Europeans.

The word Bowra comes from the Gumbaynggirr place name, Bawrrung, which possibly means cabbage tree palm. Other definitions given have been 'bullrout fish', 'scrub turkey' or 'bald head'. Originally named Bowra, the ville was added to the name in the 1870s to avoid confusion with the Southern Highlands town of Bowral.

In March 1841, Clement Hodgkinson explored the upper reaches of the Nambucca and Bellinger Rivers. He was the first European to make contact with the local Aboriginal communities. The township grew up in the 1850s and 1860s.

The town was gazetted in 1870 and Bowraville Post Office opened on 1 August 1870., and became the main centre of the Nambucca Valley. Its early industries were mainly timber and dairy, and the town eventually came to inherit the Nambucca Shire Council chambers. From about the 1960s, however, Bowraville began to decline in popularity and wealth.

Timber Industry
White settlement began in the area with the timber-getters. The first timber-getter into the area was Mr William Scott (after whom Scotts Head is named). The most popular timber was by far red cedar, of which there are now few trees left. Hoop pine was also popular. Like many Australian timber towns of this era, the town thrived for several decades, and by the 1870s boasted two hotels, several general stores, a blacksmith's, tailor, post office, a school and a number of churches.

Agriculture
By the 1880s the district was also an important dairy and pig raising area. Timber began to decline as the dominant industry by the early 20th Century, as the supply became scarce. Many jobs have been lost in recent years with the decline of the timber industry however agriculture has diversified from the traditional core of dairy farming to include beef cattle. The area has also seen the development of such activities as macadamia farms, avocado growers, agro forestry, bush foods, alpacas and organic vegetables.

The town remained relatively static throughout the 20th Century but by the 1980s this area of the New South Wales coast was attracting people looking for a better lifestyle. Today this is apparent in venues like the restored historical theatre in the main street.

Murders 

Between 1990 and 1991, three children in Bowraville were murdered. Despite two trials and much publicity, there have been no convictions for the murders. On 26 May 2016, after efforts of the families and two refusals from the Attorneys General, then Attorney General of New South Wales Gabrielle Upton announced that the NSW Court of Criminal Appeal would hear the case. Publicity generated by a popular podcast from The Australian called Bowraville possibly helped finally create enough public pressure to force the Attorney General in this decision.

Bowra Theatre
The Bowraville Theatre has become a popular tourist attraction on the Mid North Coast hinterland. Built in 1940 as a picture theatre, it was derelict for many years but it now operates as a performance space for the local theatre group, writers' group, and choir, as well as in its traditional role as a cinema. The local community brought the theatre back to life, through volunteer work and fund raising. The restored foyer was opened at the end of 2002 and on Friday 29 August 2003, the theatre re-opened its doors. The Indigenous community held a smoking ceremony and performed a welcome dance.

Like many businesses in country towns at the time of its construction, the theatre operated as a racially divided business. Aboriginal people had to buy their tickets separately, enter the theatre by a separate side entrance, sit in inferior seating below an interior partition and were permitted to do so only after the program had begun. As a result, the theatre was a stop-off on the 1965 Freedom Ride which saw students from University of Sydney tour regional NSW to highlight racism against Aboriginal people.

Demographics
According to the 2016 Australian census the median age in Bowraville is 45. The population of the town is 1,122, a decrease from 1,208 in 2011. 14.8% of residents are Aboriginal or Torres Strait Islander with the median age among this group being 21. Bowraville has a higher than average number of residents aged 65+.

84.6% of residents reported being born in Australia, higher than the national average of 66.7%. Other than Australia the most common countries of birth are England (3.3%), New Zealand (1.4%) and Germany (0.6%). 75.3% also report both parents having been born in Australia, significantly higher than the national average of 47.3%. 90.0% of people spoke only English at home.

The top religious groups in Bowraville are Anglican 22.7%, Catholic 21.7% and Uniting Church 5.7%. 26.8% of residents report no religion.

Local media
Radio Stations

hit (105.5 & 105.1), Triple M (2MC-FM 106.7 & 2CS-FM 106.3), Triple J (91.5 & 96.3), 2NVR FM (105.9)

The Nambucca Valley's community radio station, 2NVR 105.9FM, focuses on the Macksville, Bowraville, Nambucca Heads and surrounding communities.

Newspapers
 Midcoast Observer, Hibiscus Happynings, Guardian News and Coffs Coast Advocate.

See also
Rower George Elias was born in Bowraville
Greg Inglis, a rugby player who started his career in Bowraville
Billie McKay, a winner of MasterChef Australia, was born in Bowraville
Les Murdoch, an artist living in Bowraville
Rugby player Nathan Smith was born in Bowraville
Tasman Keith, an Australian rapper, was born in Bowraville

References

Towns in New South Wales
Mid North Coast